Born Lucky is a 1933 British rags to riches musical-comedy drama, directed by Michael Powell and starring Rene Ray and John Longden.  The screenplay was adapted from the 1928 novel  Mops by Marguerite Florence Barclay.

Born Lucky is one of eleven quota quickies directed by Powell between 1931 and 1936 of which no print is known to survive.  The film is not held in the BFI National Archive (nor in this case do they even hold any stills or publicity material), and is classed as "missing, believed lost". This was the first film that the great cinematographer Oswald Morris worked on as a clapper boy.

Plot
Mops (Ray), so called because of her striking curly hair, is an orphan living in the East End of London with her guardian Turnips (Talbot O'Farrell), whose nickname derives from his craft of carving flowers out of vegetables, which he sells to earn a few extra coppers to augment his income as a lighting-man at the local music hall.  Mops performs there and earns a living wage, but has to contend with the unwanted advances of the manager.  When he tries to force himself on her, Turnips beats him up and both he and Mops are sacked.

Unable to pay the rent, they are turned out of their home and decide to head off for Kent, where they know there is seasonal work to be found picking hops.  The work is hard and ill-paid, and finding enough to eat is a problem.  Mops strikes up a friendship with a younger itinerant (Longden), who seems downhearted but is soon cheered up.  One evening Turnips goes to a bakery to buy a loaf but does not have enough money.  He begins to argue and a fight breaks out; Turnips is arrested and sentenced to a term of imprisonment.  Mops visits him in the cells and he suggests she return to London and register with a training centre to try to obtain a position in service.

Having taken the advice, Mops finds a place as kitchen-maid with Lady Chard.  As the lowest in the servants' pecking-order she is given the most menial jobs and is bullied by more senior domestics.  Early one morning when she is alone in the kitchen she hears a knock, and opens the door to find the man she befriended on the road.  She helps him out of a predicament, and they begin walking out together after he successfully applies for a position with playwright Frank Dale.  Some time later Mops is dismissed from her post after being blamed for starting a fire in the house.  She goes to visit her beau, and finds him smartly-dressed and in conversation with a theatrical impresario.  He admits that he is really Frank Dale, and all along he has been using her as research material for his new play.  On being told of Mops' music hall background, Frank and the impresario offer her the lead role in the play.  Both the play and Mops are overnight sensations, and she is welcomed by society.  After Frank has rid himself of his grasping fiancée, and Mops has exacted her revenge on the magistrate who imprisoned Turnips, the couple are married and the future looks bright for them and the newly released Turnips.

Cast
 Rene Ray as Mops
 John Longden as Frank Dale
 Talbot O'Farrell as Turnips
 Ben Welden as Harriman
 Barbara Gott as Cook
 Helen Ferrers as Lady Chard
 Roland Gillett as John Chard
 Paddy Brown as Patty

Reception
Surviving contemporary reviews show a muted critical response to the film.  Kine Weekly wrote: "'The treatment shows some imagination, if the stars shine but dimly", adding that the hop-picking sequences were "picturesque and original".  Picturegoer Weekly found less to impress, stating: "It is all very naïve and the continuity is rather ragged owing to an excess of varied detail which makes for lack of cohesion".

References

External links 
 
 
 

1933 films
1933 musical comedy films
British musical comedy films
Films directed by Michael Powell
Films by Powell and Pressburger
Lost British films
British black-and-white films
1930s English-language films
Films based on British novels
1933 lost films
Lost musical comedy films
1930s British films